Claiton Alberto Fontoura dos Santos, (born 25 January 1978) better known as Claiton, is a Brazilian football manager and former player who played as a midfielder.

Club statistics

Honours
Internacional
Rio Grande do Sul State Championship: 1997, 2002, 2003

Vitória
Bahia State Championship: 2000

Bahia
Bahia State Championship: 2001
Nordeste Cup: 2001

Santos
Brazilian League: 2004

Flamengo
Guanabara Cup: 2007
Rio de Janeiro State Championship: 2007

External links

 furacao
 CBF
 zerpzero.pt
 globoesporte
 sambafoot

Living people
1978 births
Footballers from Porto Alegre
Brazilian footballers
Brazilian football managers
Association football midfielders
Brazilian expatriate footballers
Expatriate footballers in Japan
Expatriate footballers in Switzerland
Campeonato Brasileiro Série A players
Swiss Super League players
J1 League players
J2 League players
Sport Club Internacional players
Esporte Clube Bahia players
Esporte Clube Vitória players
Servette FC players
Santos FC players
Nagoya Grampus players
Botafogo de Futebol e Regatas players
CR Flamengo footballers
Hokkaido Consadole Sapporo players
Club Athletico Paranaense players
Esporte Clube Pelotas players
Esporte Clube Novo Hamburgo players
Esporte Clube Passo Fundo players
Alecrim Futebol Clube players
Clube Esportivo Aimoré managers
Sport Club São Paulo managers
Esporte Clube Cruzeiro managers